Nicolás Rossi may refer to:
 Nicolás Rossi (footballer, born 1998)
 Nicolás Rossi (footballer, born 2002)